Norman Wilson Ray (born 25 June 1942) is a retired vice admiral in the United States Navy who served Deputy Chairman of the NATO Military Committee from 1992 to 1995. Ray graduated from the United States Naval Academy in 1964. After his retirement, he later served as the president of a defense contacting firm.

References

1942 births
Living people
People from Hillsboro, Illinois
United States Naval Academy alumni
Military personnel from Illinois
United States Naval Aviators
United States Navy personnel of the Vietnam War
United States Navy vice admirals